The Philippines campaign, Battle of the Philippines, Second Philippines campaign, or the Liberation of the Philippines, codenamed Operation Musketeer I, II, and III, was the American, Mexican, Australian and Filipino campaign to defeat and expel the Imperial Japanese forces occupying the Philippines during World War II. 

The Japanese Army overran all of the Philippines during the first half of 1942. The liberation of the Philippines from Japan commenced with amphibious landings on the eastern Philippine island of Leyte on October 20, 1944. The United States and Philippine Commonwealth military forces, with naval and air support from Mexico and Australia, were progressing in liberating territory and islands when the Japanese forces in the Philippines were ordered to surrender by Tokyo on August 15, 1945, after the dropping of the atomic bombs on mainland Japan and the Soviet invasion of Manchuria.

Planning
American forces under Fleet Admiral Chester W. Nimitz had advanced across the Central Pacific Ocean, capturing the Gilbert Islands, some of the Marshall Islands, and most of the Marianas Islands, bypassing many Japanese Army garrisons and leaving them behind, with no source of supplies and militarily impotent.

Aircraft carrier-based warplanes were already conducting air strikes and fighter sweeps against the Japanese in the Philippines, especially their military airfields. U.S. Army and Australian Army troops under the American General Douglas MacArthur, the Supreme Commander of the Southwest Pacific Theater of Operations, had either overrun, or else isolated and bypassed, all of the Japanese Army on New Guinea and the Admiralty Islands. Before the invasion of the Philippines, MacArthur's northernmost conquest had been at Morotai in the Dutch East Indies on September 15–16, 1944. This was MacArthur's one base that was within bomber range of the southern Philippines.

U.S. Navy, Marine Corps, and Army as well as Australian and New Zealand forces under the commands of General MacArthur and Admiral William F. Halsey, Jr. in Operation Cartwheel had isolated the large Japanese South Pacific base at Rabaul, New Britain, by capturing a ring of islands around Rabaul, and then building air bases on them from which to bomb and blockade the Japanese forces at Rabaul into military impotence.

With victories in the Marianas campaign (on Saipan, on Guam, and on Tinian, during June and July 1944), American forces were getting close to Japan itself. From the Marianas, the very long-range B-29 Superfortress heavy bombers of the U.S. Army Air Forces (USAAF) could bomb the Japanese home islands from well-supplied air bases – ones with direct access to supplies via cargo ships and tankers. (The earlier B-29 bombing campaign against Japan had been from the end of a very long and tortuous supply line via British India and British Burma – one that proved to be woefully inadequate. All B-29s were transferred to the Marianas during the fall of 1944.)

Although Japan was obviously losing the war, the Japanese Government, and the Imperial Japanese Army and Navy, showed no sign of capitulation, collapse, or surrender.

There had been a close relationship between the people of the Philippines and the United States since 1898, with the Philippines becoming the Commonwealth of the Philippines in 1935, and promised their independence in mid-1946. Furthermore, an extensive series of air attacks by the American Fast Carrier Task Force under Admiral William F. Halsey against Japanese airfields and other bases on the Philippines had drawn little Japanese opposition, such as interceptions by the Japanese Army fighter planes. Upon Admiral Halsey's recommendation, the Combined Chiefs of Staff, meeting in Canada, approved a decision not only to move up the date for the first landing in the Philippines, but also to move it north from the southernmost island of Mindanao to the central island of Leyte, Philippines. The new date set for the landing on Leyte, October 20, 1944, was two months before the previous target date to land on Mindanao.

The Filipino people were ready and waiting for the invasion. After General MacArthur had been evacuated from the Philippines in March 1942, all of its islands fell to the Japanese. The Japanese occupation was harsh, accompanied by atrocities and with large numbers of Filipinos pressed into slave labor. From mid-1942 through mid-1944, MacArthur and Nimitz supplied and encouraged the Filipino guerrilla resistance by U.S. Navy submarines and a few parachute drops, so that the guerrillas could harass the Japanese Army and take control of the rural jungle and mountainous areas – amounting to about half of the archipelago. While remaining loyal to the United States, many Filipinos hoped and believed that liberation from the Japanese would bring them freedom and their already-promised independence.

The Australian government offered General MacArthur the use of the First Corps of the Australian Army for the Liberation of the Philippines. MacArthur suggested that two Australian infantry divisions be employed, each of them attached to a different U.S. Army Corps, but this idea was not acceptable to the Australian Cabinet, which wanted to have significant operational control within a certain area of the Philippines, rather than simply being part of a U.S. Army Corps. No agreement was ever reached between the Australian Cabinet and MacArthur – who might have wanted it that way. However, units from the Royal Australian Air Force and the Royal Australian Navy, such as the heavy cruiser , were involved.

In addition to rejecting Australian ground troops MacArthur also rejected the use of U.S. marines for major ground combat operations during the whole 10 months of the Philippines campaign. The only contributions by the U.S. Marine Corps in this campaign were USMC aircraft and aviators, who greatly helped to provide air cover for the U.S. Army soldiers and assisted U.S. Army Air Forces aircraft, and one small USMC artillery unit, V Amphibious Corps (VAC) Artillery, commanded by Brigadier General Thomas E. Bourke. These 1,500 USMC artillerymen only fought in the Philippines during the Battle of Leyte from October 21 to December 13. This small artillery corps was the only USMC ground combat unit that served in the Philippines in 1944-45.

During the American re-conquest of the Philippines, the guerrillas began to strike openly against Japanese forces, carried out reconnaissance activities ahead of the advancing regular troops, and took their places in battle beside the advancing American divisions.

Leyte

On October 20, 1944, the U.S. Sixth Army, supported by naval and air bombardment, landed on the favorable eastern shore of Leyte, one of the islands of the Visayas island group, northeast of Mindanao. The Japanese miscalculated the relative strength of the naval and air forces, and they attempted to destroy the landing. This brought about the massive sequence of battles called the Battle of Leyte Gulf, fought on October 23 through October 26. This decisive victory by the U.S. Navy, its Fast Carrier Task Force, its surface fleet, and its submarines effectively destroyed the remainder of the Imperial Japanese Navy (IJN), which had already lost all of its effective aircraft carrier forces. The IJN had four of its carriers sunk (ships with depleted air squadrons – which were used only as decoys), numerous battleships and heavy cruisers, and a large number of light cruisers and destroyers. The IJN was never able to fight a major battle after this.

The U.S. Sixth Army continued its advance from the east, as the Japanese rushed reinforcements to the Ormoc Bay area on the western side of the island. While the Sixth Army was continually reinforced, the U.S. Fifth Air Force and the U.S. 3rd Fleet's Task Force 38 were able to devastate the Japanese attempts at air attacks and at landing new reinforcements and supplies, and also provide much support to the Army's ground troops during what is known as the Battle of Ormoc Bay from November 11 to December 21, 1944.

The Filipino guerrillas also performed valuable service in maintaining public order and in keeping the roads and highways free of congestion. After the American beachheads were established, the Leyte guerrilla groups were attached directly to the Sixth Army corps and divisions to assist in scouting, intelligence, and combat operations.
With the initial U.S. Sixth Army landings on the beaches at Tacloban and Dulag, Colonel Ruperto Kangleon's units went into action. They dynamited key bridges to block Japanese displacement toward the target area; they harassed enemy patrols; and they sabotaged supply and ammunition depots. Information on enemy troop movements and dispositions sent from guerrilla outposts to Kangleon's Headquarters was dispatched immediately to Sixth Army.

During many torrential rains and over difficult terrain, the advance continued across Leyte and onto the major island of Samar, just north of Leyte. On December 7, 1944, the U.S. Army units made another amphibious landing at Ormoc Bay and, after a major land and air battle, the landing force cut off all Japanese ability to reinforce and resupply their troops on Leyte. Although fierce fighting continued on Leyte for months, the U.S. Army was always in control.

Mindoro

The U.S. 6th Army's second major target to attack was Mindoro. This large island is directly south of Luzon and Manila Bay, and MacArthur's main goal in taking it was to be able to construct airfields on it for fighter planes that could dominate the sky over the most-important island of Luzon, with its major seaport and capital city of Manila.

The Seventh Fleet's large invasion convoy from Leyte to Mindoro came under strong attack by kamikazes, but they could not delay the American invasion of Mindoro. Mindoro was only lightly occupied by the Japanese Army, and much of it was held by Filipino guerrillas, so Mindoro was quickly overrun. U.S. Army engineers set about rapidly constructing a major air base at San Jose. Besides being close to Luzon, Mindoro has another advantage: good flying weather nearly all the time, because this is a part of the Philippines that is relatively dry – quite unlike Leyte which receives torrential rains most of the year, not only giving it poor flying weather, but making it very muddy and difficult to construct airfields.

Mindoro was also the location of another breakthrough: the first appearance during the War in the Pacific of USAAF squadrons flying the fast, long-range P-51B Mustang fighters.
Mindoro was a major victory for the 6th Army and the USAAF, and it also provided the major base for the next move of MacArthur's 6th Army: the invasion of Luzon, especially at Lingayen Gulf on its western coast.

Luzon

On December 15, 1944, landings against minimal resistance were made on the southern beaches of the island of Mindoro, a key location in the planned Lingayen Gulf operations, in support of major landings scheduled on Luzon. On January 9, 1945, on the south shore of Lingayen Gulf on the western coast of Luzon, General Krueger's Sixth Army landed his first units. Almost 175,000 men followed across the twenty-mile (32 km) beachhead within a few days.

Two more major landings followed, one to cut off the Bataan Peninsula, and another, which included a parachute drop, south of Manila. Pincers closed on the city. On February 3, 1945, elements of the U.S. 1st Cavalry Division pushed into the northern outskirts of Manila, and the 8th Cavalry Regiment (organized as infantry) passed through the northern suburbs and into the city itself.

As the advance on Manila continued from the north and the south, the Bataan Peninsula was rapidly secured. On February 16, paratroopers and amphibious units simultaneously assaulted the islet of Corregidor. Taking this stronghold was necessary because troops there could block the entrance of Manila Bay. The Americans needed to establish a major harbor base at Manila Bay to support the expected invasion of Japan, planned to begin on November 1, 1945. Resistance on Corregidor ended on February 27, and then all resistance by the Japanese Empire ceased on August 15, 1945, obviating the need for an invasion of the Japanese Home Islands.

Despite initial optimism, fighting in Manila was harsh. It took until March 3 to clear the city of all Japanese troops, and the Japanese Marines, who fought on stubbornly and refused to either surrender or to evacuate as the Japanese Army had done. Fort Drum, a fortified island in Manila Bay near Corregidor, held out until April 13, when a team of Army troops went ashore and pumped 3,000 gallons of diesel fuel into the fort, then set off incendiary charges. No Japanese soldiers in Fort Drum survived the blast and fire.

In all, ten U.S. divisions and five independent regiments battled on Luzon, making it the largest American campaign of the Pacific war, involving more troops than the United States had used in North Africa, Italy, or southern France.

Finishing up the campaign

Palawan Island, between Borneo and Mindoro, the fifth largest and westernmost island of the Philippines, was invaded on February 28, with landings of the Eighth United States Army at Puerto Princesa. The Japanese put up little direct defense of Palawan, but cleaning up pockets of Japanese resistance lasted until late April, with the Japanese using their common tactic of withdrawing into the mountains and jungles, dispersed as small units. Throughout the Philippines, U.S. forces were aided by Filipino guerrillas to find and dispatch the holdouts, the last of whom, Hiroo Onoda, did not surrender until 1974, in the mountains of Lubang Island in Mindoro.

The U.S. Eighth Army then moved on to its first landing on Mindanao (April 17), the last of the major islands of the Philippines to be taken. Mindanao was followed by invasion and occupation of Panay, Cebu, Negros and several islands in the Sulu Archipelago. These islands provided bases for the U.S. Fifth and Thirteenth Air Forces to attack targets throughout the Philippines and the South China Sea.

Following additional landings on Mindanao, U.S. Eighth Army troops continued their steady advance against stubborn resistance. By the end of June, the enemy pockets were compressed into isolated pockets on Mindanao and Luzon where fighting continued until the Japanese surrender on August 15, 1945. However, some units of the Japanese Army were out of radio contact with Tokyo, and it was difficult to convince some of them that Japan had surrendered, becoming Japanese holdouts. As at many Pacific Islands, major Japanese officials, including members of the Imperial Family, visited in person to convince the soldiers that they must surrender by order of the Emperor.

Casualties

U.S. Army and Army Air Forces

Japanese

See also
 Battle of Villa Verde Trail 
 Dalton Pass
 Escuadrón 201
 Philippine Liberation Medal

Notes

References

Bibliography

 

 
 
 
 
 
 
 

Conflicts in 1944
Conflicts in 1945
1944 in the Philippines
1945 in the Philippines
Philippines campaign 1944-45
Military history of the Philippines during World War II
Philippine Army
Campaigns of World War II